Chyra or Hyra is a Polish surname. Notable people with the surnames include:

Chyra 
 Chyra, character from the 1929 film One Stolen Night
 Andrzej Chyra (born 1964), Polish actor
 Gran Chyra, character from the TV show Utopia Falls
 Robert Chyra (born 1974), Polish Paralympic athlete
  (born 1948), Polish historian

Hyra 
 Andrew Hyra, American musician, half of the duo Billy Pilgrim, brother of actress Meg Ryan
 Brad Hyra, American musician of Trapped Under Ice 
 Cliff Hyra (born 1982), American patent attorney and politician
 , Polish general
 Meg Ryan (born Margaret Hyra; 1961), American actress and producer of Polish descent

Polish-language surnames